Izsak is a small lunar impact crater that is located on the Moon's far side, hidden from view from the Earth. It lies about half-way between the walled plains Fermi to the northeast and Milne to the southwest. Due south of Izsak is the larger crater Schaeberle. Izsak is a circular, nearly symmetric crater formation with a sharp-edged rim that has received little erosion. At the midpoint of the interior floor is a small central peak.

Satellite craters 

By convention these features are identified on lunar maps by placing the letter on the side of the crater midpoint that is closest to Izsak.

See also 
 1546 Izsák, asteroid

References 

 
 
 
 
 
 
 
 
 
 
 

Impact craters on the Moon